Cañas is a municipality of La Rioja, Spain. It was the birthplace of Saint Dominic of Silos (1000-1073).

The abbey of Santa María de San Salvador de Cañas for Cistercian nuns was founded in this town by Lope Díaz I de Haro and his wife Aldonza in 1169 and 1170. Its wealth and power culminated during the 13th century under the abbess Urraca Díaz de Haro, between 1222 and 1262. The nuns benefited from the patronage of the Haro family until its extinction in 1322. The community is still active today and retains fragments of its medieval library, particularly a complete Burgundian antiphonary from around 1200, and a Castilian missal from 1267 to 1279.

Politics

Notable people
 Dominic of Silos, saint in the Catholic Church.

Points of interest

Monastery of Santa María

Parish church of the Assumption

Saint Mary Hermitage

Notes

Municipalities in La Rioja (Spain)